Homi Powri (born 1922) was an Indian cyclist. He competed in the individual and team road race events at the 1948 Summer Olympics.

References

External links
 

1922 births
Possibly living people
Indian male cyclists
Olympic cyclists of India
Cyclists at the 1948 Summer Olympics
Place of birth missing
Parsi people